Solanum species are used as food plants by the larvae of a number of Lepidoptera species including:

Angle shades (Phlogophora meticulosa)
Bedellia species:
B. annuligera - recorded on S. melongena
B. orchilella - recorded on S. melongena
B. somnulentella - recorded on S. melongena
Bright-line brown-eye (Lacanobia oleracea)
Cabbage moth (Mamestra brassicae)
Common swift (Korscheltellus lupulina)
Double-striped pug (Gymnoscelis rufifasciata)
Endoclita malabaricus
Garden dart (Euxoa nigricans)
Ghost moth (Hepialus humuli)
Heart and dart (Agrotis exclamationis)
Hypercompe cermelii
Hypercompe icasia
Hypercompe indecisa
Large yellow underwing (Noctua pronuba)
Map-winged swift (Pharmacis fusconebulosa)
The nutmeg (Discestra trifolii)
Setaceous Hebrew character (Xestia c-nigrum)
Small angle shades (Euplexia lucipara)
Tobacco hornworm (Manduca sexta)
Tomato hornworm (Manduca quinquemaculata)
Trichophassus giganteus
Turnip moth (Agrotis segetum)

External links

Solanum
+Lepidoptera